Earl of Carlisle is a title that has been created three times in the Peerage of England.

History 
The first creation came in 1322, when Andrew Harclay, 1st Baron Harclay, was made Earl of Carlisle. He had already been summoned to Parliament as Lord Harclay (or Lord Harcla) in 1321. However, Lord Carlisle was executed for treason in 1323, with his titles forfeited.

The second creation came in 1622, when James Hay, 1st Viscount Doncaster, was made Earl of Carlisle. He was a great favourite of James I and had already been created Lord Hay in the Peerage of Scotland in 1606, as well as Baron Hay, of Sawley in the County of York, and Viscount Doncaster in 1618. The latter titles were in the Peerage of England. Lord Carlisle was the member of a junior branch of the Hay family, headed by the Earl of Erroll. He was succeeded by his second but only surviving son, the second Earl. In 1637, he also succeeded his maternal grandfather, Charles Goring, 2nd Earl of Norwich, as second Baron Denny (a title created by writ in 1604; see Earl of Norwich). However, Carlisle was childless and on his death in 1660, all the titles became extinct.

The third creation came in 1660, when Sir Charles Howard was made Baron Dacre of Gillesland, in the County of Cumberland, Viscount Howard of Morpeth, in the County of Northumberland, and Earl of Carlisle. A member of the prominent Howard family, he was the great-grandson of Lord William Howard, third son of Thomas Howard, 4th Duke of Norfolk. Lord William Howard's wife was Elizabeth Dacre, youngest daughter of Thomas Dacre, 4th Baron Dacre (of Gillesland), a title which had fallen into abeyance on the death of the fifth Baron in 1569. Through this marriage, Naworth Castle and Henderskelfe Castle (which later became the site of Castle Howard) came into the Howard family. Lord Carlisle had earlier supported the Parliamentarian cause in the Civil War, and he is supposed to have been created Baron Gilsland and Viscount Howard of Morpeth by Oliver Cromwell in 1657 (it is certain that he was summoned to Cromwell's House of Lords the same year as "Lord Viscount Howard").

He was succeeded by his eldest son, the second Earl. He represented Morpeth, Cumberland and Carlisle in the House of Commons and served as Lord Lieutenant of Cumberland. On his death, the titles passed to his son, the third Earl. He was a prominent statesman and served as First Lord of the Treasury from 1701 to 1702, and in 1715. His third but eldest surviving son, the fourth Earl, sat as Member of Parliament for Morpeth. He was succeeded by his eldest son from his second marriage, the fifth Earl. He was an influential politician and held office as First Lord of Trade, as Lord Lieutenant of Ireland, as Lord Steward of the Household and as Lord Privy Seal.

His eldest son, the sixth Earl, also gained political prominence. He served as First Commissioner of Woods and Forests and as Lord Privy Seal, and was Minister without Portfolio between 1830 and 1834 in the famous Whig government of Lord Grey. He was succeeded by his eldest son, the seventh Earl. He was a noted politician and served as Chief Secretary for Ireland, as Chancellor of the Duchy of Lancaster and as Lord Lieutenant of Ireland. He never married and was succeeded by his younger brother, the eighth Earl. He was a clergyman and served as Rector of Londesborough in Yorkshire. He also died unmarried and was succeeded by his nephew, the ninth Earl. He was the son of the Hon. Charles Wentworth George Howard, fifth son of the sixth Earl. He represented Cumberland East in Parliament as a Liberal and was also a well-regarded painter.

His eldest son, the tenth Earl, was Liberal Unionist Member of Parliament for Birmingham South. He was succeeded by his only son, the eleventh Earl. He married as his first wife Bridget Helen Monckton, 11th Lady Ruthven of Freeland (see Lord Ruthven of Freeland for earlier history of this title). On his death in 1963, the titles passed to his only son, the twelfth Earl. In 1982, he also succeeded his mother as twelfth Lord Ruthven of Freeland. , the peerages are held by his eldest son, the thirteenth Earl, who succeeded in 1994. Lord Carlisle unsuccessfully contested Easington in the 1987 general election and Leeds West in the 1992 general election.

Several other members of this branch of the Howard family have gained distinction. The Hon. Sir Charles Howard, fourth son of the third Earl, was a general in the Army and also represented Carlisle in the House of Commons for many years. Charles Howard, Viscount Morpeth, eldest son of the fourth Earl from his first marriage, briefly represented Yorkshire before his early death from tuberculosis. The Hon. Frederick Howard, third son of the fifth Earl, was a major in the 10th Hussars and fought at the Battle of Waterloo in 1815, where he was killed in action. His eldest son Frederick John Howard was Member of Parliament for Youghal. The Very Reverend the Hon. Henry Edward John Howard, fourth son of the fifth Earl, was Dean of Lichfield. His third son Edward Henry Howard was a vice-admiral in the Navy.

Admiral the Hon. Edward Granville George Howard, fourth son of the sixth Earl, was created Baron Lanerton in 1874. The aforementioned the Hon. Charles Wentworth George Howard, fifth son of the sixth Earl, represented East Cumberland in Parliament for almost forty years. Lady Harriet Howard, third daughter of the sixth Earl, was the wife of George Sutherland-Leveson-Gower, 2nd Duke of Sutherland. She was Mistress of the Robes to Queen Victoria and an active Whig in society circles. The Hon. Geoffrey William Algernon Howard, fifth son of the ninth Earl, was a Liberal Member of Parliament. His second son was George Howard, Baron Howard of Henderskelfe.

The heir apparent to the earldom, when one exists, is styled Viscount Morpeth.

The principal family seat today is Naworth Castle, while Castle Howard is now held by a cadet branch of the family.

Earls of Carlisle, first creation (1322)
 Andrew Harclay, 1st Earl of Carlisle (died 1323) (forfeit 1323)

Earls of Carlisle, second creation (1622)
 James Hay, 1st Earl of Carlisle (c. 1590–1636)
 James Hay, 2nd Earl of Carlisle (1612–1660) (extinct)

Earls of Carlisle, third creation (1661)
 Charles Howard, 1st Earl of Carlisle (1629–1685)
 Edward Howard, 2nd Earl of Carlisle (1646–1692); eldest son of the 1st Earl
 Charles Howard, 3rd Earl of Carlisle (1669–1738); eldest son of the 2nd Earl
 Henry Howard, 4th Earl of Carlisle (1694–1758); eldest son of the 3rd Earl
 Hon. Charles Howard, Viscount Morpeth (1719–1741); eldest son of the 4th Earl
 Hon. Robert Howard, Viscount Morpeth (1725/6–1743); 2nd son of the 4th Earl
 Frederick Howard, 5th Earl of Carlisle (1748–1825); youngest son of the 4th Earl
 George Howard, 6th Earl of Carlisle (1773–1848); eldest son of the 5th Earl
 George William Frederick Howard, 7th Earl of Carlisle (1802–1864); eldest son of the 6th Earl
 Hon. Frederick George Howard; 2nd son of the 6th Earl
 William George Howard, 8th Earl of Carlisle (1808–1889); 3rd son of the 6th Earl
 Hon. Edward Granville George Howard, 1st and last Baron Lanerton (1809–1880); 4th son of the 6th Earl
 Hon. Charles Wentworth George Howard (1814–1879); 5th son of the 6th Earl
 George James Howard, 9th Earl of Carlisle (1843–1911); son of Hon. Charles Wentworth George Howard, nephew of the 8th Earl and grandson of the 6th Earl
 Charles James Stanley Howard, 10th Earl of Carlisle (1867–1912); eldest son of the 9th Earl
 George Josslyn L'Estrange Howard, 11th Earl of Carlisle (1895–1963); eldest son of the 10th Earl
 Charles James Ruthven Howard, 12th Earl of Carlisle (1923–1994); eldest son of the 11th Earl
 George William Beaumont Howard, 13th Earl of Carlisle (born 1949); eldest son of the 12th Earl

The heir presumptive is the present holder's brother, the Hon. Philip Charles Wentworth Howard (born 1963).
The heir presumptive's heir apparent is his only son, William Philip Alexander Howard (born 1994).

Line of succession 

  Frederick Howard, 5th Earl of Carlisle (1748–1825)
 George Howard, 6th Earl of Carlisle (1773–1848)
 Hon. Charles Wentworth George Howard (1814–1879)
  George James Howard, 9th Earl of Carlisle (1843–1911)
  Charles James Stanley Howard, 10th Earl of Carlisle (1867–1912)
  Lt Cdr. George Josslyn L'Estrange Howard, 11th Earl of Carlisle (1895–1963)
  Charles James Ruthven Howard, 12th Earl of Carlisle (1923–1994)
  George William Beaumont Howard, 13th Earl of Carlisle (born 1949)
 (1) Hon. Philip Charles Wentworth Howard (born 1963)
 (2) William Howard (born 1994)
 Hon. Oliver Howard (1875–1908)
 Hubert Arthur George Howard (1901–1986)
 (3) David Charles Hubert Howard (born 1940)
(4). Oliver Charles Frederick Howard (born 1980)
 Hon. Geoffrey William Algernon Howard (1877–1935)
  Major George Anthony Geoffrey Howard, Baron Howard of Henderskelfe (1920–1984)
 (5) Hon. Nicholas Paul Geoffrey Howard (born 1952)
 (6) George Fulco Geoffrey Howard (born 1985)
Hon. Simon Bartholomew Geoffrey Howard (1956–2022)
 (7) Merlin Jasper Geoffrey Howard (born 2002)
 (8) Hon. Anthony Michael Geoffrey Howard (born 1958)
 Major Hon. Frederick Howard (1785–1815)
 Frederick John Howard (1814–1897)
Alfred John Howard (1848–1916)
William Gilbert Howard (1877–1960)
Frederick Henry Howard (1915–2000)
(9). Henry James Howard (b. 1956)
(10). William Henry Howard (b. 1986)
(11).  John Dugald Howard (b. 1958)
John William Howard (1917–1988)
(12). Jonathan Arthur Francis Howard (b. 1955)
(13). William Richard Michael Howard (b. 1986)
 Gerald Richard Howard (1853–1945)
 Bertram Marcus Howard (1890–1970)

The Earls of Carlisle are distantly in line to succeed to the Dukedom of Norfolk, as descendants of Lord William Howard.

See also
 Earl of Erroll
 Duke of Norfolk
 Lord Ruthven of Freeland
 Earl of Effingham
 Baron Howard de Walden
 Earl of Suffolk (1603 creation)
 Earl of Berkshire (1626 creation)
 Viscount Fitzalan of Derwent
 Baron Howard of Penrith
 Baron Howard of Escrick
 Baron Lanerton
 Baron Stafford (1640 creation)

References

External links

 Kidd, Charles; Williamson, David (editors). Debrett's Peerage and Baronetage (1990 edition). New York: St Martin's Press, 1990.
 

Earldoms in the Peerage of England
Extinct earldoms in the Peerage of England

Forfeited earldoms in the Peerage of England
Noble titles created in 1322
Noble titles created in 1622
Noble titles created in 1661